Ali Kalaiî (born 22 March 1986) is a Tunisian football goalkeeper who currently plays for US Ben Guerdane.

References

1986 births
Living people
Tunisian footballers
CS Sfaxien players
EGS Gafsa players
JS Kairouan players
Stade Gabèsien players
CS Chebba players
US Ben Guerdane players
Association football goalkeepers
Tunisian Ligue Professionnelle 1 players